TradeMark (a.k.a. It was completed in 2007 and has 28 floors and 200 residential units. Additionally it is one of the tallest buildings in Uptown Charlotte.

News stories
WBTV of Charlotte has reported on three floods and elevator problems in the one-year-old building, raising concern over the quality of construction.  Repairs for the June 3rd, 2008, flood (reported on June 4) that were promised to the flood victims by management company Duvall have, as of August 1, 2008, yet to take place.  Victims of the prior floods complained about Duvall's lack of responsiveness.  TradeMark was builder Boulevard Centro's first major high-rise building construction project.

See also
 List of tallest buildings in Charlotte

References

 Emporis
 Trademark Video Tour

Residential skyscrapers in Charlotte, North Carolina
Residential buildings completed in 2007
2007 establishments in North Carolina